Sphenomeris is a genus of ferns in the family Lindsaeaceae.

Species 
, the Checklist of Ferns and Lycophytes of the World recognized the following species:
Sphenomeris clavata (L.) Maxon
Sphenomeris killipii (Maxon) Kramer
Sphenomeris spathulata (Maxon) Kramer
Other sources place these species in the genus Odontosoria.

References

Lindsaeaceae
Fern genera